The 2019 Gunma gubernatorial election was held on 21 July 2019 to elect the next governor of Gunma.

Candidates 
Ichita Yamamoto back by LDP and Komeito. He is a former MP for LDP.
Kiyoto Ishida, back by the JCP. He is a former teacher union leader.

Results

See also

References

External links
群馬県知事選挙（令和元年7月21日執行）開票結果

2019 elections in Japan
July 2019 events in Japan
Gubernatorial elections in Japan
Politics of Gunma Prefecture